The Lower Manya Krobo constituency is in the Eastern region of Ghana. The current member of Parliament for the constituency is Michael Teye Nyuanu. He was elected  on the ticket of the on the ticket of the National Democratic Congress and  won a majority of 4,697 votes more than candidate closest in the race, to win the constituency election to become the MP. He had earlier represented the constituency in the 4th Republican parliament.

See also
List of Ghana Parliament constituencies

References

Parliamentary constituencies in the Eastern Region (Ghana)